James Boyd Hunter (12 July 1910 – 1976) was a Scottish professional footballer who played in the Football League for Mansfield Town and Plymouth Argyle.

References

1910 births
1976 deaths
Scottish footballers
Association football forwards
English Football League players
Ilkeston United F.C. players
Ripley Town F.C. players
Mansfield Town F.C. players
Plymouth Argyle F.C. players
Preston North End F.C. players